Lough Barra is a freshwater lake in the northwest of Ireland. It is located in north County Donegal in the valley along the Gweebarra fault.

Geography

Hydrology
Lough Barra is fed mainly by the Barra River entering at its northern end. The lake drains southwards into the Gweebarra River. The lake, like other area lakes, is oligotrophic.

Natural history
Fish species in Lough Barra include brown trout, salmon and the critically endangered European eel. Lough Barra is part of the Cloghernagore Bog and Glenveagh National Park Special Area of Conservation, which also includes Lough Beagh.

See also
List of loughs in Ireland

References

External links

Barra